Pietro Ferrero (2 September 1898 – 2 March 1949) was the founder of Ferrero SpA, an Italian confectionery and chocolatier company. His company invented Nutella, a hazelnut-cream spread, which is now sold in over 160 countries. Ferrero Rochers are also made by his company, Ferrero, as were Tic-Tacs and the Kinder chocolate brand.

References

1898 births
1949 deaths
People from the Province of Cuneo
20th-century Italian businesspeople
Pietro
People from Farigliano